A common perception is that the birth of Cooperative Extension followed the passage of the Smith-Lever Act of 1914, which provided federal funds to land-grant universities to support Extension work.  In the formal sense, this is true.  Even so, the roots of Cooperative Extension extend as far back as the late 18th century, following the American Revolution, when affluent farmers first began organizing groups to sponsor educational meetings to disseminate useful farming information. In some cases, these lectures were delivered by university professors — a practice that foreshadowed Cooperative Extension work more than a century later.

These efforts became more formalized over time. By the 1850s, for example, many schools and colleges had begun holding farmer institutes — public meetings where lecturers discussed new farming insights.

The Morrill Land-Grant College Act of 1862

A milestone in the history of Cooperative Extension occurred in 1862, when Congress passed, and President Abraham Lincoln signed into law, the Morrill Land-Grant College Act, which granted each state 30,000 acres (120 km²) of public land for each of its House and Senate members. States gained the ability to use this land as trust funds through which colleges could be endowed for the teaching of agriculture and other practical arts.

The Morrill Act made possible the formation of the Agriculture and Mechanical College of Alabama (later Alabama Polytechnic Institute) in 1872, succeeding the former East Alabama Male College, a Methodist institution established in 1856.  Despite being plagued initially with severe financial problems, the college, which ultimately became Auburn University, was destined to become the first headquarters of a statewide Extension program.

The Second Morrill Act of 1890

In one sense, the first land-grant college act was limited. While it secured a means of establishing agricultural and mechanical colleges, it did not provide a steady source of funding to states to support these institutions.  The second Morrill Act, passed in 1890, not only provided this funding but also prohibited racial discrimination by any college receiving these funds.  However, so long as the federal funds were distributed "equitably," states could circumvent this anti-discrimination provision by establishing separate institutions for white and black citizens.  The separate black agricultural and mechanical schools established throughout the South later became known as 1890 land-grant institutions.

The Huntsville Normal School (later Alabama A&M University)

 The first black school to function as an 1890 institution was the Huntsville Normal School (now Alabama A&M University) near Huntsville, established by the Alabama Legislature in 1873 and opened in 1875 with two instructors and 61 students and with an annual appropriation of $1,000.  In 1891, the school, renamed the State Normal and Industrial School at Huntsville in 1878, began receiving some of the funds provided by the Second Morrill Act.

Limitations of the Morrill Act

Despite the lofty visions and aspirations reflected in both Morrill Acts, the land grant university system showed signs of foundering toward the close of the 19th century.  The emerging colleges faced serious challenges establishing courses of study that appealed to potential students, particularly Southerners, many of whom were dealing with the far more pressing task of reconstructing an agricultural system badly disrupted by wartime conditions.  Moreover, because of the ample land available in the West, many farmers had little incentive to adopt intensive farming methods and other advanced agricultural technologies.   Agricultural colleges also were criticized for not providing students with the types of training that enabled them to return to their family farms. Many land-grant college graduates were leaving farming altogether.

The Hatch Experiment Station Act of 1887

Most pressing of all, many observers believed, was the glaring lack of solid agricultural research on which to base this practical teaching. Seeking to address this critical need, Congress passed the Hatch Experiment Station Act of 1887, which provided funding for agricultural experiment stations in each state.

In the opinion of many educators and policymakers, passage of this legislation represented a major stride toward improving farming.  Even so, Experiment Station personnel soon discerned that scientific insights generated through research at these stations could not be fully utilized unless they were effectively communicated to farmers.

J.F. Duggar, director of the experiment station at API, and other faculty members felt a strong obligation to reach farmers throughout the state in addition to the "young leaders" who had come to Auburn to undertake formal coursework.  He and many faculty members maintained extensive correspondence with many of these farmers, though, over time, this correspondence became increasingly voluminous.  Faculty members also were aware that many of the farmers in the most critical need of new farming knowledge were unable to write.

Some face-to-face contact already was provided through farmer institutes, district schools and similar efforts offered through the nation's Experiment Stations.

Even so, many Experiment Station researchers believed that these limited outreach efforts were insufficient.  Many also were concerned that these efforts diverted critically needed funds away from the stations' primary directive — conducting research.

Seaman Knapp

An aging college instructor and administrator often is credited with taking a major, if not critical, lead in efforts that eventually culminated in formal Cooperative Extension work.   In the view of some, he rightly deserves the title of "father" of the Extension Service.

Seaman Ashael Knapp (1831–1911) was a Union College graduate, Phi Beta Kappa member, physician, college instructor, and, later, administrator, who took up farming late in life, moving to Iowa to raise general crops and livestock.

The first seeds of what would later become an abiding interest in farm demonstration were planted after he became active in an organization called "The Teachers of Agriculture," attending their meetings at the Michigan Agricultural College in 1881 and the Iowa Agricultural College in 1882.   Knapp was so impressed with this teaching method that he drafted a bill for the establishment of experimental research stations, which later was introduced to the 47th Congress, laying the foundation for a nationwide network of agricultural experiment stations.

Knapp later served as president of Iowa Agricultural College, but his interest in agricultural demonstration work did not occur until 1886, when he moved to Louisiana and began developing a large tract of agricultural land in the western part of this state.

Knapp neither could persuade local farmers to adopt the techniques he had perfected on his farm, nor could he enlist farmers from the North to move to the region to serve collectively as a sort of educational catalyst.  What he could do, he reasoned, was to provide incentives for farmers to settle in each township with the proviso that each, in turn, would demonstrate to other farmers what could be done by adopting his improved farming methods.

The concept worked.  Northern farmers began moving into the region, and native farmers began buying into Knapp's methods.

By 1902, Knapp was employed by the government to promote good agricultural practices in the South.

Based on his own experience, Knapp was convinced that demonstrations carried out by farmers themselves were the most effective way to disseminate good farming methods. His efforts were aided by the onslaught of the boll weevil, a voracious cotton pest whose presence was felt not only in Louisiana but also throughout much of the South.  Damage associated with this pest instilled fear among many merchants and growers that the cotton economy was disintegrating around them.

In the view of many, a farm demonstration at the Walter G. Porter farm, now a National Historic Landmark in Terrell, Texas, set up by the Department of Agriculture at the urging of concerned merchants and growers, was the first in a series of steps that eventually led to passage of the legislation that formalize Cooperative Extension work.

USDA officials were so impressed with the success of this demonstration that they appropriated $250,000 to combat the weevil — a measure that also involved the hiring of farm demonstration agents. By 1904, some 20 agents were employed in Texas, Louisiana and Arkansas.  The movement also appeared to be spreading to neighboring Mississippi and Alabama.

Tuskegee Institute

Tuskegee Institute (now known as Tuskegee University), a black, largely privately funded school, laid much of the foundation for what ultimately would become Cooperative Extension work.  Much of the credit for these pioneering efforts can be attributed directly to Booker T. Washington, founder of the institute, and to world-renowned agricultural researcher George Washington Carver.

The first annual Tuskegee Farmer Conference, begun at the prompting of  Washington in 1892, initially attracted some 500 participants.  Still held annually, the conference is regarded not only as the cornerstone of black agricultural outreach work but as a major milestone in the development of Cooperative Extension work in general

Nevertheless, much like their counterparts at nearby API and in other and other land-grant institutions, Washington and Carver understood that the insights generated at Tuskegee and other agricultural research facilities throughout the nation could not be fully utilized unless they were successfully imparted to farmers.

Jesup wagons

With this in mind, Tuskegee pioneered the use of agricultural demonstration wagons (commonly known as Jesup wagons in honor Morris Jesup, the New York banker and philanthropist who underwrote the cost for their fitting and equipment) to instruct farmers and sharecroppers in far-flung regions of the state about efficient farming methods.  Carver not only drafted the plans for the wagons but also selected the equipment, drew instructional charts and suggested lecture topics to be delivered at each visit.

The wagons were so successful that they eventually were adopted as an integral part of the U.S. Department of Agriculture's outreach program.

Thomas Monroe Campbell, of Tuskegee Institute, was appointed the nation's first black extension agent in 1906 and assigned to operate the Jesup wagons under Carver's oversight.  By 1925, African American (known at the time as Negro) Extension work encompassed 31 agents working in 21 Alabama counties.

Alabama Polytechnic Institute
Alabama Polytechnic Institute (API) went a long way toward laying the groundwork for Cooperative Extension work in the state. Even before passage of the Smith-Lever Act, Luther Duncan, a 1900 API graduate, had organized numerous Boys' Corn Clubs throughout the state totaling more than 10,000 members in conjunction with his work with the U.S. Department of Agriculture's Bureau of Plant Industries.

The beginning of formal cooperative extension work in Alabama

A major milestone in formal Cooperative Extension work in Alabama was passed in 1906, when Seaman Knapp launched cooperative farm demonstration work.  At the time, Knapp was overseeing Farmers Cooperative Demonstration Work nationally through the U.S. Department of Agriculture's Bureau of Plant Industry.  C.R. Hudson, James C. Phelps, and C.S. Waldrop were appointed to do farm demonstration work among white farmers in what was then a heavily segregated state, while T.M. Campbell was appointed to carry out similar demonstration work on behalf of black farmers.

Three years later, Knapp drafted an agreement with then-API President C.C. Thach and Experiment Station Director and API Professor J.F. Duggar by which Extension work through the public schools in Alabama would be carried out jointly by the U.S. Department of Agriculture and API.  This agreement formed the basis for similar agreements with land-grant institutions in other states

The plan provided for a "demonstration expert," employed by the U.S Department of Agriculture and jointly selected by Bureau of Plant Industry and API, who, under Knapp's direction, would be charged with carrying out the work of both agencies.  The Bureau of Plant Industry was to provide the salary and travel expenses for the expert, while API would provide office space and an additional $300 for clerical assistance.

This demonstration expert was entrusted with a wide range of responsibilities including providing agricultural demonstration in the public schools, before boys clubs and through other effective ways; advising public school administrators on appropriate courses of agricultural courses of study; encouraging the formation of school gardening work; and assisting the Experiment Station with farmer institutes and short courses.  The demonstration expert also was expected to cooperate closely with the demonstration agents throughout the state and to attend their meetings.  And while he was made a professor of Extension in API's School of Agriculture and selected in the same manner as other faculty members, he was prohibited from teaching regular coursework at the institution.  Also, while he was to serve as a special agent representing the U.S. Department of Agriculture under Knapp's supervision, he was also expected to work closely with Experiment Station Director J.F. Duggar, assisting with that division's outreach efforts.

Franklin County native Luther Duncan, a 1900 API alumnus, was selected for this role.

By 1910, there were 37 agents at work in 41 Alabama counties, though operating under the USDA.  Even so, the salaries of many of these employees were supplemented by county funding — a practice that would distinguish formal Cooperative Extension work for the next century.

Corn and Tomato Clubs

Duncan's involvement in organizing Boys' Corn Clubs, forerunners of 4-H clubs, marked another major step toward the formalization of Cooperation Extension work.  Ostensibly organized to teach farm boys advanced agricultural methods, the clubs served a dual purpose.  Duncan and other professional agricultural workers throughout the nation who organized these clubs reasoned that children often were more receptive to technological change than their parents.  In time, fathers adopted these techniques themselves after observing their sons' successes.  Similar successes were noted with girls' tomato clubs — an outreach technique closely patterned after the corn clubs — as mothers began adopting canning and other food preservation techniques imparted to their daughters.

The first two clubs were organized in 1909 in Tuscaloosa and Calhoun counties.  County Superintendents H.P. Parsons and Perry B. Hughes took an active role in helping organize these clubs.  More than 390 boys were enrolled in these counties and growing corn for prizes.

By 1916, Boys Clubs were operating in all of Alabama's 67 counties, with an enrollment of almost 4,000 members.

Girl's clubs, formally known at the time as girls' tomato clubs, were started in 1911 in Pike and Walker counties.  Each member was allotted a tenth of an acre, encouraged to grow tomatoes and awarded prizes based on their work.

Passage of the Smith-Lever Act of 1914

In 1914, the long-awaited Smith-Lever Act, which has been regarded as "one of the most striking educational measures ever adopted by any government," finally was passed.   The act provided for state matching of federal funds to establish a network of county farm educators in every state in the nation.  The agreement with the states drafted shortly after passage of the act stipulated that not only Smith-Lever-related Extension work but all Extension-related work associated with the U.S. Department of Agriculture in a state would be carried out through the state college of agriculture. Likewise, each state college was expected to establish a separate Extension division with a leader responsible for administering state and federal funds.

Alabama formally accepted the provisions of the Smith-Lever Act in 1915, organizing the Alabama Extension Service under the direction of the Alabama Polytechnic Institute in Auburn.  J.F. Duggar, a long-serving API administrator, assumed the reins of the new organization, while Duncan was appointed superintendent of Junior and Home Economics Extension in cooperation with the USDA.  These two units operated independently until Duncan was named head of the Alabama Extension Service in 1920.

The act initially provided $10,000 each year to agricultural colleges in each state to use exclusively in agricultural and home economics outreach, with the added provision that this funding would increase annually in state each according to growing demand, but only so long as states agreed to match these funds.

Alabama Extension was organized into four areas of emphasis: farm demonstrations; woman's work, including home demonstrations and girls canning; junior Extension, particularly boy's corn clubs, pigs clubs and similar forms of outreach; and Extension work by specialists.

Under the Smith-Lever Act, administrative oversight of Tuskegee's Extension program came under the direction of Duggar in 1915, though in a de facto sense, the program remained autonomous and under the direction of African-Americans.

Despite its pioneering efforts in extension work, Tuskegee was not eligible to receive 1890 funds until 1972.

Initial focus

The Alabama Extension Service initially focused on improving the bleak economic prospects of Alabama farmers, most of whom raised cotton under the persistent threat of the boll weevil. As funds permitted, home demonstration agents were employed to provide farm wives with practical assistance with food preservation and other home-related improvements.

Eventually, program areas were expanded to include assistance with dairying, livestock production, agronomy, horticulture, farm marketing and plant and animal diseases. Youth outreach, typically in the form of Boys and Girls Clubs, also comprised an integral part of Extension work.

In 1914, forty-three of Alabama's 67 counties were served by agents. By the 1920s, Extension agents, many of whom were college graduates, were operating out of fully staffed and equipped offices in many counties. Enhanced federal and state funding enabled the Extension Service to hire 11 full-time and part-time subject-matter specialists to provide agents with guidance and assistance with program delivery.  The basic contours of the system were in place.  From this comparatively modest beginning, Alabama Extension eventually built a statewide presence with fully staffed and equipped offices in all 67 counties.

Farm demonstration

Farm demonstration work throughout the state encompassed 68 county agents under the supervision of J.T. Watt, state demonstration agent, who was headquartered at Auburn and assisted by three demonstration agents: A.D. Whitehead; W.L. Lett: and C.M. Maudlin.  The county agents were charged with assisting in every way possible the agricultural development in their counties.

Woman's work

After passage of the Smith-Lever Act, plans were put into effect to ensure the rapid growth of what then was known as woman's work, including the number of women agents.  The work was to be targeted specifically to women and their needs rather than indirectly through farm demonstration agents and specialists pursuing the more general goal of improving agricultural and rural conditions.

The work initially was supervised by two state leaders: Madge J. Reese, who was headquartered in Auburn; and Nellie Tappan, who was headquartered in Montevallo.  Their work primarily involved supervision of the canning club movement.

Junior extension

Junior Extension included both home economics and junior work.  Luther Duncan was assigned overall supervision of this area, with assistance from Madge Reese and Nellie Tappan, as well as from I.B. Kerlin and J.C. Ford, the state's pig club agent.

Specialist work

A number of highly specialized Extension educators, known as specialists, soon were involved in work throughout the state, devoting all of their time to critical concerns such as dairying and hog cholera work.  Other specialists, who were also assigned teaching and research work on the Auburn campus, were able to devote only part of their time to this type of outreach work.

Already at this early stage, specialists were holding various types of meetings, carrying on extensive correspondence with farmers throughout the state, developing cropping and rotation systems, working out cream-gathering routes and undertaking a campaign for the prevention and restriction of hog cholera.

Movable schools

Inspired by Tuskegee Institute educators, Alabama Extension assigned specialists to movable schools, which then were dispatched to counties throughout the state.  Extension drafted plans to develop at least 15 of these schools for white farmers and "about as many" for their black counterparts.

Mass media

Extension educators also began production of what would become one of the mainstays of Cooperative Extension work:  mass media outreach — in this case, brief, timely articles on farm-related topics for county newspapers. The initial goal was to produce a column for every county newspaper each week for several successive weeks.

An emerging pattern of Alabama Extension work

Eventually, program areas were expanded to include assistance with dairying, livestock production, agronomy, horticulture and plant and animal diseases.  Youth outreach, typically in the form of Boys and Girls Clubs, also comprised an integral part of Extension work.

Developing a sound farm marketing strategy for the growing diversity of Alabama-grown products was considered an especially important focus of Alabama Extension's initial efforts.  Responsibility was assigned to D.J. Burleson, who also focused on building rural organizations.

Another issue considered critical was rural sanitation, particularly measures aimed at reducing the risks of malaria and typhoid fever.

In 1914, forty-three of Alabama's 67 counties were served by agents.  By the 1920s, Extension agents, many of whom were college graduates, were operating out of fully staffed and equipped offices in many counties.  Enhanced federal and state funding also enabled the Extension Service to hire 11 full-time and part-time subject-matter specialists to provide agents with guidance and assistance with program delivery.

The basic contours of the system were in place.  From this comparatively modest beginning, Alabama Extension eventually built a statewide presence with fully staffed and equipped offices in all 67 counties.

Tuskegee's role under the Smith-Lever Act

Under the Smith-Lever Act, administrative oversight of Tuskegee's Extension program came under the direction of Duggar in 1915, though in a de facto sense, the program remained autonomous and under the direction of African-Americans.

Despite its pioneering efforts in extension work, Tuskegee was not eligible to receive 1890 funds until 1972.

Historical Panorama of Alabama Agriculture

As part of its commemoration of Auburn University's Sesquicentennial in 2006, the Alabama Cooperative Extension System reintroduced a series of agriculture-related murals it commissioned for display at the 1939 Alabama State Fair.  Known as the Historical Panorama of Alabama Agriculture, the murals depict key events of Alabama agricultural history.

They were designed every bit as much for their educational as aesthetic value.  Setting out the purpose for the murals, then-Alabama Extension Director P.O. Davis noted that "agriculture in Alabama, and in this nation, is in a period of change — a change toward improvement and progress."  Alabama, Davis stressed, was diversifying, moving from a primarily cotton-based economy "into a combination of cotton and other cash crops plus livestock and poultry." He envisioned a dual purpose for the murals and supporting exhibits: to celebrate Alabama's rich agricultural history but also to focus farmers on a "vision of the future."

Painted by Mobile native John Augustus Walker, one of Alabama's premiere artists of the era, these murals are among Alabama Extension's most prized artifacts and reflect one of the most significant chapters in the state's agricultural history. They also are considered prime examples of Works Progress Administration-related art associated with the Great Depression era.

Technological adoption

Using new technology to enhance the scope and impact of its programming has been a focus of Cooperative Extension work nationwide.  In Alabama, Extension and its sister organization, the Experiment Station, began using emerging radio technology as early as 1922 when funds were secured to purchase a small radio station known as WMAV.  By 1925, WAPI, "the Voice of Alabama," a far more powerful station, was broadcasting a 1,000-watt signal from the third floor of Comer Hall on the API (now Auburn University) campus.  In addition to news and weather, the station broadcast educational programs related to agriculture and homemaking.

Satellite uplinking

WAPI marked one of many ways throughout history that Alabama Extension has used emerging electronic technology to extend its message to a wider audience. In the late 1980s, then-Extension Director and Auburn University Vice President for Extension Ann E. Thompson, worked with Auburn University Telecommunications and the Auburn University Athletic Department to create the Auburn University Satellite Uplink.

As an integral part of this effort, a statewide network was created and every county Extension office in the state was equipped with a satellite receiver so that each of these offices could serve as a reception site for educational programs provided from Auburn University. Moreover, during breaking news events throughout the 1990s, Extension used the uplink to provide live interviews and television newscasts throughout the state.

Alabama Extension's Auburn University headquarters also was equipped with a full-service studio and live production facility so that Extension field offices would have had full access to live and recorded productions via satellite. The Auburn University facility was also equipped with a multimedia lab, which is now provides video and audio Web streaming.

Videoconferencing
In the 1990s, Alabama Extension established 33 videoconferencing sites in county offices and regional centers throughout the state, affording all Alabama residents short drive times to facilities where they can view educational and certification-related programs provided over the Internet. Typically, training provided by statewide Extension subject-matter experts via videoconferencing is supplemented with instruction from county and regional experts at the reception site.

Digital diagnostics
In addition to the C. Beaty Hanna Horticulture and Environmental Center, six Regional Research and Extension Centers and more than twenty-five county Extension offices throughout the state were equipped with digital diagnostic capabilities to provide farmers and homeowners with rapid detection of plant-borne diseases.

Web site
The Alabama Cooperative Extension System Web site is accessed by as estimated 6.5 million visitors from across the globe each year.  Alabama Extension also was an early adopter of web blogs not only as a more efficient way to educate its audiences but also to disseminate breaking news to key media gatekeepers throughout the state. These web blogs are being enhanced with streamed interviews with Extension experts.

Virtual Extension
Within the last decade, the advent of the Web and associated technologies has forced Alabama Extension and other state Extension programs to reassess the delivery of information - a view first expressed by Charles D. Ray in an article published in the April, 2007 edition of the Journal of Extension.

In his August, 2007 edition of Extension Connections, then-Alabama Director Gaines Smith introduced an outreach concept known as Virtual Extension, which was inspired by Ray's Journal of Extension article.

The concept reflected several changes that have become apparent to Extension administrators and educators within the last few years – first and foremost, that Extension's Web presence would continue to outpace traditional sources of outreach, particularly face-to-face contact.  In Smith's view, this was not surprising, considering that clients increasingly looked to Extension's Web presence "as the most accessible source of information about Extension-related programs and services."

Smith also observed that as Alabama Extension's organizational identity and online presence become fused, the Web presence would increasingly be viewed as a major interface with the public.

While he viewed these changes as offering great opportunities, he also stressed that they would hold major implications and challenges.

Smith perceived that these changes would have major implications for how Extension programs were conceived and implemented. In the past, program-related Extension Web sites merely were on-line reflections of face-to-face programming efforts.  However, Smith contended that these roles increasingly were being reversed. He perceived that Extension programs would increasingly take on the identity of the Web presence.

He contended that the changes taking place pushed Extension educators in the direction of virtual relationship building and that Extension educators consequently should not only become comfortable with this emerging approach but also effective in building online client relationships through social networking, blogging, and similar approaches.

Smith stated that transforming Alabama Extension into a leader in this new era of outreach would be a major focus of his – and the organization's – future efforts.

Notes

See also 
Alabama Cooperative Extension System
Cooperative Extension Service
Luther Duncan
List of land-grant universities
National Association of State Universities and Land-Grant Colleges
State university
Agricultural extension
Historical Panorama of Alabama Agriculture

Alabama Cooperative Extension System
History of Alabama
Auburn University
Tuskegee University